Triberg im Schwarzwald is a town in Baden-Württemberg, Germany, located in the Schwarzwald-Baar district in the Black Forest.  Triberg lies in the middle of the Black Forest between 500 and 1038 metres above sea level.

Elektrizitäts-Gesellschaft Triberg, a regional utility, was founded 1896 by Friedrich Wilhelm Schoen, Wilhelm Eduard von Schoen and the famous industrialist and inventor Carl von Linde. It is still active today and partially owned by local municipalities. Watchmaking was once a thriving local industry, but no longer plays a central role in the economy. A private hospital, Asklepios Klinik, is the town's major employer. 

The number of inhabitants was estimated at around 4.650 in 2022. In 2020, the population was estimated at 4,656.

Sights
 The Triberg Waterfalls, a series of waterfalls in the Gutach River, are among the highest in Germany. With a total vertical drop of 151m (496 feet), the falls are not as high as the highestst waterfall in Germany, which is the Röthbachfall. However, the Triberg Falls are better known and have easier public access.
 Black Forest Museum (Schwarzwaldmuseum)
 Maria in der Tanne (Mary in the Firs), a baroque pilgrimage church dating from the 17th Century, once a destination of pilgrimage.
 The handcarved council chamber (which can be seen on the town website)
 World's biggest cuckoo clock
 40 tunnels of the Black Forest Railway around Triberg.
 A monument dedicated to Robert Gerwig
 Men's parking spaces, a global first introduced in 2012
 Triberg Gallows on the nearby heights of Hochgericht
 A 23 metre high observation tower dedicated to the town's victims of the First World War

The Schwarzwaldbahn Erlebnispfad (Black Forest Railway Experience) is a walking route that takes in some of these sights.

Namesake
The asteroid 619 Triberga is named after this town.

Notable inhabitants
 Efim Bogoljubow (1889–1952), Russian-born German chess player and world championship challenger
 Albrecht Dold (1928–2011), mathematician and professor in Heidelberg
 Christof Duffner (born 1971), former ski jumper
 Hubert Lienhard (born 1951), Chairman of the Board of Management of Voith
 Hans-Peter Pohl (born 1965), Olympic winner in Nordic Combined Calgary 1988

See also
 List of largest cuckoo clocks
 Triberg chess tournament

Legacy 
Famous american novelist Ernest Hemingway mentioned Triberg in his short story The Snows of Kilimanjaro.
The Hemingway Days were held annually from 1999 to 2002 until they finally were canceled because of a controversy regarding his alleged war crimes.

Gallery

References

External links

  The town website, including a downloadable town plan
  Triberg on the "alemannische-seiten" website
 Triberg Tourism Information and Pictures
 

Schwarzwald-Baar-Kreis